Wadesboro may refer to a place in the United States:

Wadesboro, Florida
Wadesboro, Kentucky
Wadesboro, North Carolina